Sacred Heart Senior High School (SAHESS) is a second cycle institution located in Nsoatre in the Sunyani West Municipal District in the Bono Region of Ghana. In 2022, the school emerged winners of the maiden insurance quiz competition hosted by the National Insurance Commission in the Bono Region.

History 
The school was established in 1977. It was later absorbed in 1984 into the public system.

References 

Schools in Ghana
High schools in Ghana
Public schools in Ghana